Macel Patricia Leilani Wilson (born May 5, 1943) is an American beauty pageant titleholder who was crowned Miss USA 1962. Previously crowned Miss Hawaii USA 1962, Wilson was the first entrant from Hawaii, first Asian American, and first woman of color to win Miss USA. Later in life, Wilson relocated to Denmark and became a film editor for the Danish Broadcasting Corporation (DR) and a visual artist.

Pageantry
Wilson began competing in pageantry after she was crowned Miss Hawaii USA 1962. As Miss Hawaii USA, Wilson competed at Miss USA 1962 in Miami. She went on to win the title, becoming the first entrant from Hawaii, first Asian American, and first woman of color to win the title. As Miss USA, she went on to place in the Top 15 at Miss Universe 1962, also held in Miami, behind winner Norma Nolan of Argentina. After Miss Universe, Wilson was asked to fill in for Nolan during a Miss Universe event at the Orange Bowl Parade in Miami when Nolan fell ill with the measles.

Personal life
Wilson attended President Theodore Roosevelt High School and Miami Dade College. 

In 1967, Wilson married Danish civil engineer Jens Henrik Packness and relocated with him to Copenhagen. While in Denmark, Wilson began studying film at the University of Copenhagen and taking private painting classes. They returned to Copenhagen in 1976. Wilson became a film editor at the Danish Broadcasting Corporation (DR) in 1978, until her retirement in 2000, and has held art exhibitions in Danish galleries since 1999.

References

External links
 Archive of Macel Wilson's web site, in Danish and English

1943 births
20th-century American people
American beauty pageant winners
American beauty pageant winners of Chinese descent
American emigrants to Denmark
American film editors
American people of English descent
American people of Native Hawaiian descent
American people of Portuguese descent
American women film editors
Living people
Miami Dade College alumni
Miss Universe 1962 contestants
Miss USA 1960s delegates
Miss USA winners
People from Honolulu
University of Copenhagen alumni